Czarnowo may refer to the following places:
Czarnowo, Kuyavian-Pomeranian Voivodeship (north-central Poland)
Czarnowo, Nowy Dwór Mazowiecki County in Masovian Voivodeship (east-central Poland)
Czarnowo, Podlaskie Voivodeship (north-east Poland)
Czarnowo, Ostrołęka County in Masovian Voivodeship (east-central Poland)
Czarnowo, Lubusz Voivodeship (west Poland)
Czarnowo, Pomeranian Voivodeship (north Poland)
Czarnowo, West Pomeranian Voivodeship (north-west Poland)